The Mendocino Ridge AVA is a coastal, cool climate and high altitude American Viticultural Area located entirely within the coastal zone of Mendocino County, California.  The boundaries of the AVA encompass the coastal ridges adjacent to the Pacific Ocean that reach inland toward the Anderson Valley. Roughly 36 miles of the southernmost portion of the Mendocino Coast make up the western boundary of the AVA, with the Sonoma County line as the southern boundary, the Navarro River as the northern boundary and Anderson Valley as the inland boundary running northwest–southeast. The Mendocino Ridge AVA "is essentially a northern extension of the true Sonoma Coast viticultural area." However, the Mendocino Ridge AVA designation is unique in that it is limited by elevation, reserved only for vineyards at or above 1200 feet. This is why the Mendocino Ridge AVA has been nicknamed "Islands in the Sky®," because the vineyards sitting at 1200 feet or higher are often perched above thick fog moving inland from the Pacific Ocean blanketing the coast and the valleys between the ridge tops, making the tips of the mountains look like islands protruding from a sea of fog. In this overlapping, "[t]he Mendocino Ridge AVA floats above the Anderson Valley and Mendocino appellations." Mendocino Ridge is the only non-contiguous AVA in the United States; all others are contiguous landmasses with all vineyards inside the boundaries designated as part of the AVA, whereas Mendocino Ridge in comparison only includes the higher altitude growing sites. "There are 262,400 acres (410 square miles, 36 miles long from north to south) within the outer boundaries of the Mendocino Ridge viticultural area, but the actual viticultural area encompasses only 87,466 acres which lie above 1,200 feet elevation. Of these 87,466 acres, approximately 1,500 to 2,000 acres (2% of the total acreage) of the ridge tops are suitable for vineyards. The side-slopes are very steep (often above 70%) and covered with timber, making them unfit for planting". Estimates of planted acres range from 233 to 410, which accounts for about 0.3% of the total area. These planted acres are scattered among 16 remote vineyards.

The 18 vineyards in the Mendocino Ridge AVA are: Fashauer Vineyards, Arietta-Dupratt Vineyard, Ciapusci Vineyard, Copper Queen, Drew Winery at Faîte De Mer Farm, Ferrari-Carano Vineyards – Sky High Ranch, Gianoli Ranch Vineyards, Greenwood Ridge Vineyards, Highlands Vineyard, Mariah Vineyards and Winery, Perli Vineyards, Philo Crest Vineyards, Manchester Ridge Vineyard, Baker Ranch Vineyard, Signal Ridge Vineyard, Valenti Vineyard, Wentworth Vineyard, and Zeni Vineyard.

The wineries located inside the Mendocino Ridge AVA are: Baxter Winery, Drew Family Cellars, Greenwood Ridge Winery, Mariah Vineyards and Winery, and Phillips Hill Winery.

The average high temperature  is 75.9 °F and the average low temperature is 49.4 °F. In the Mendocino Ridge AVA "[t]he diurnal variation during the growing season is significantly less than the Anderson Valley (20 degrees versus 40-50 degrees in Anderson Valley), and daytime high temperatures are often 10 degrees cooler than in the Anderson Valley." The soil composition is of the "timber" type, shallow and with good drainage due to the ridge top locations. Average annual rainfall average is 58 inches, leaving sufficient groundwater to dry farm vineyards.

While Mendocino Ridge was only approved as an AVA in 1997, it has some of the oldest vineyards in the region. Italian immigrants in the late 1800s planted on Greenwood Ridge and surrounding areas, preferring zinfandel which remains a popular varietal in the AVA, although pinot noir has become the most common grape in the region since the 1990s. Other plantings (ordered by decreasing representation in total acres) include Chardonnay, Syrah, Merlot, Riesling, Sauvignon Blanc, Primitivo, Petite Sirah, Cabernet Sauvignon, and Grüner Veltliner. Much of the non-planted land is covered by Redwood and Douglas Fir trees.

References 

American Viticultural Areas
American Viticultural Areas of California
American Viticultural Areas of Mendocino County, California
1997 establishments in California